Howard is an 'L' station in Chicago, Illinois. It is the northern terminus of the Red Line and the southeastern terminus of the Yellow Line; it also serves the Purple Line, for which it is the southern terminus at non-rush hour times on weekdays and all day on weekends. Trains on the Chicago North Shore and Milwaukee Railroad (North Shore Line) also stopped at Howard from 1926 until that line was abandoned in 1963.

Location

Howard station is located at 7519 North Paulina Street in Chicago, Illinois, at Paulina Street and Howard Street. The station is in the Rogers Park community area of Chicago, just south of the border with the city of Evanston. It is one of four 'L' stations in Rogers Park, the others being Jarvis, Morse, and Loyola.

History

The Chicago and Evanston Railroad constructed a route from Union Station in Chicago into Evanston in 1885 that became the Chicago and Evanston branch of the Chicago, Milwaukee & St. Paul Railroad (Milwaukee Road). In 1908, the Northwestern Elevated Railroad extended service north from Wilson station and into Evanston using the right of way of the Milwaukee Road. The Northwestern Elevated took over the operation of passenger services from the Milwaukee Road, rebuilt the stations along the line, and added new stations including one at Howard Avenue (now Howard Street). The station was rebuilt in 1921 when the line through the station was elevated onto an embankment. An escalator was added in 1964.

Between 2006 and 2009, the station was rebuilt. A  new station house was constructed on Paulina Street providing an accessible path between the station platforms and the multi-story parking garage and bus terminal to the west of the station. The platforms and canopies were rebuilt, and the former main entrance on Howard Street entrance was renovated to be used as an auxiliary entrance to the new station. The station remained open throughout reconstruction, which was completed on March 20, 2009.

Station layout
A Park and Ride with 634 spaces, and sheltered bicycles provided at this station. A large maintenance yard and rolling stock storage facility, known as Howard Yard, is just north of the station. Northbound Purple and Yellow Line trains pass through the yard on the way to their terminal, and Red Line trains travel from the northbound platform to the southbound platform via a balloon loop in the yard. Southbound Yellow Line and non-rush hour Purple Line trains terminate at this station using track 3, located between the Red Line tracks, south of the station.

Connecting bus routes
CTA
22 Clark
97 Skokie
147 Outer DuSable Lake Shore Express
201 Central/Ridge (Monday–Saturday only)
206 Evanston Circulator (weekday rush hours only)

Pace
213 Green Bay Road (Monday–Saturday only)
215 Crawford/Howard
290 Touhy Avenue

References

External links 

Howard Station Page at Chicago-'L'.org
Red Line Train schedule (PDF) at CTA official site
Purple Line Train schedule (PDF) at CTA official site
Yellow Line Train schedule (PDF) at CTA official site
Howard Station Page on the CTA official site
Howard Street entrance from Google Maps Street View
Howard Street North Side Exit (former North Shore Line Entrance) from Google Maps Street View

CTA Purple Line stations
CTA Red Line stations
CTA Yellow Line stations
Chicago "L" terminal stations
Railway stations in the United States opened in 1908
Former North Shore Line stations
1908 establishments in Illinois